Thubana is a genus of moths in the family Lecithoceridae and subfamily Torodorinae. The genus was erected by Francis Walker in 1864.

Species

Former species
 Thubana adelella (Walker, 1864)

References

 
Torodorinae
Moth genera